{{Infobox person
 | name        = Russ Mitchell
 | image       = Russ mitchell.jpg
 | birthname   = Russell Edward Mitchell
 | birth_date  = 
 | birth_place = St. Louis, Missouri, USA
 | education   = University of Missouri
 | occupation  = Journalist, news anchor
 | spouse      = 
 | credits     = The Early Show -  Saturday edition  (1997–2007, 2011)  The Early Show - (weekdays) news anchor (2007–2010)  CBS Evening News Weekend  (Saturdays, 1999–2009,(Sundays, 2006–2010, Weekends 2010–2011) CBS News Sunday Morning}}

Russell Edward Mitchell (born March 25, 1960) is an American journalist best known for his career at CBS where he was anchor of The Early Show on Saturday, news anchor for The Early Show during the week, and weekend anchor of the CBS Evening News.

In December 2011, it was announced that he would leave CBS to join WKYC in Cleveland, Ohio, as a lead anchor, starting in January 2012.

Biography
Early years
Mitchell was born in St. Louis, Missouri, and was raised in Rock Hill. He attended high school in Webster Groves in suburban St. Louis, and went on to graduate from the University of Missouri with a Bachelor of Journalism degree in 1982.

Career
Russ Mitchell's first television job came while he was still in high school, working as a part-time switchboard operator at KTVI in his native St. Louis. After graduation from Mizzou, Mitchell worked as a reporter with Kansas City television station KMBC. Mitchell was later an anchor for WFAA Dallas (1983–1985), reporter at KTVI St. Louis (1985–1987), and a weekend anchor and reporter for KMOV St. Louis (1987–92). He joined CBS News in 1992 as co-anchor of Up to the Minute. He was a correspondent for Eye to Eye on CBS (1993–95), anchor of the CBS Sunday Night News (1995-1997), an original co-anchor on Saturday Early Show (1997-2007, 2011), news anchor for the weekday edition of The Early Show (2007-2010), anchor of the CBS Sunday Evening News (2006-2011) and of the CBS Saturday Evening News (1999-2009; & both Saturday and Sunday later 2010–2011). He also substituted for Harry Smith, Jane Robelot and Mark McEwen  on CBS This Morning, the predecessor to the Early Show, and was a correspondent on CBS News Sunday Morning.  He was also a primary substitute for Dan Rather,                                      John Roberts, Bob Schieffer, Katie Couric and Scott Pelley on CBS Evening News''.

In December 2011, it was announced that he would move to Cleveland NBC affiliate WKYC, replacing Romona Robinson. Said Mitchell of the change: "I've been thinking about going back to local television for a few years... It's been a great run at CBS, but I miss the pulse of a local newsroom, and, being from the Midwest, I miss being part of a community. But I wasn't going to go just anywhere. Cleveland reminds me a great deal of the city where I grew up, and I'm looking forward to bringing my family because I think we're going to have a really good life there."

Personal life 
Mitchell was married to Erica Townsend from 1987 to 2000. Their daughter Ashley is a college student. He married Karina Mahtani on December 2, 2006. They live in Cleveland, Ohio.

Honors and awards 
 1989: Missouri UPI, Best Reporter honor
 1995: National Association of Black Journalists Award
 1997: Emmy Award, for coverage of the crash of TWA's flight 800; with two additional from the St. Louis chapter of the National Academy of Television Arts and Sciences
 2001: Society of Professional Journalists, Sigma Delta Chi Award, for the CBS Evening News with Russ Mitchell's coverage of the Elian Gonzales story
 2005: New York Association of Black Journalists Award, Best Documentary, for a Sunday Morning report on Stax Records
 2006: Press Club of Metropolitan St. Louis 18th Annual Media Person of the Year

References

External links
 

1960 births
Living people
African-American journalists
African-American television personalities
Television anchors from Cleveland
American male journalists
American television reporters and correspondents
Emmy Award winners
People from St. Louis
Missouri School of Journalism alumni
Webster Groves High School alumni
CBS News people
60 Minutes correspondents
21st-century African-American people
20th-century African-American people